Ludwig von 88 is a French punk rock and alternative rock band mostly active in the 1980s and 1990s, and which gained an important success in the underground scene of its country. The band has not released any new material since 2019, but has not disbanded and is thus officially still active. Their music is quite similar to that of influent French punks Bérurier Noir (both bands were initially signed with the Bondage Records indie rock label): two-fingered and distorted guitar chords and drum machine as a drummer but can also imitate reggae or medieval music ("Messire Quentin"). Their lyrics evolved along their career from nonsensical and often juvenile humour to something more serious and sometimes social and political.

The band had different line-ups, among which the most famous from the late 80’s featured Karim Berrouka on vocals, Nobru (real name Bruno Garcia, his new pseudonym is Sergent Garcia) on guitars, Laurent and then Charlu on bass, and Jean-Mi on programming. Past members include Olaf, Gondrax (François Gondry, bass player) and Laurent Manet. 

They made their reputation through endless and delirious shows performed by disguised musicians. Among their notable stage clothing: cycling jerseys, diving suits, Mexican ponchos and various funny headgear.

Some of their songs are satires on stars like Louison Bobet, Nicolae Ceauşescu, Maria Callas, Jacques Chirac, Jodie Foster, Clint Eastwood ["Harry Callahan (I wanna be a poulet)"]  or TV series such as Star Trek ("Spock around the clock") and parodies (album 17 plombs pour péter les tubes)  of commercially successful songs by artists such as Julien Clerc ("Laissez entrer le soleil"), Sabrina Salerno ("Summertime Love (Boys, Boys, Boys...)") Led Zeppelin ("Stairway to Heaven") or Mylène Farmer ("Libertine"). Others deal with more serious topics like war: "Libanais raides", "Hiroshima"; drugs: "Le Manège enchanté", "Kaliman"; cults: "Les Allumés de Krishna", "Jim Jones" "Christ Cosmique"; and misery: "LSD for Ethiopie", "In the Ghettos"—always with irony. Karim Berrouka is also a noted science-fiction and fantasy writer, who has received the Elbakin.net prize for  Fées, Weed et Guillotines (fairies, weed and guillotine) and the Julia Verlanger prize for Le club des punks contre l'apocalypse zombie (The famous punks vs the zombie apocalypse).

Discography

Albums
 Houlala 1986
 Houlala II "la mission" 1987
 Ce jour heureux est plein d'allégresse 1990
 Tout pour le trash 1992
 17 plombs pour péter les tubes 1994
 Prophètes et Nains de jardin 1996
 Houlala III "l'heureux tour" live, 1998
 La révolution n'est pas un dîner de gala 2001
 20 chansons optimistes pour en finir avec le futur 2019

Singles, 45 rpm, EP
 "Live?" 1985
 "Les trois petits keupons" 1987
 "Louison Bobet for ever" 1987
 "Guerrier Balubas" 1988
 "Sprint" 1988
 "Sardellen Filet" 1989
 "L.S.D. for Ethiopie (We Are The World)" 1990
 "New Orleans" 1991
 "In the Ghettos" 1993
 "TAMERANTONG" 1993
 "Hiroshima (50 ans d'inconscience)" 1995
 "Le crépuscule des fourbes" 1996
 "La sacrée grole" 1997
 "Ludwig von 88", live 1997
 "St-Valentin" 1998

Compilation albums
 De l'âge du trash à l'âge du zen 2004
 De l'âge de la crête à l'âge du bonze 2004

References

External links
  Site officiel
  Facebook page 
 Discography 
  Interview of Karim Berrouka 
  The story of Ludwig von 88
  Reviews of the records of Ludwig von 88
  40 years of Ludwig von 88

French punk rock groups
Musical quintets
Musical groups established in 1984
Musical groups disestablished in 1999
Musical groups from Paris